Judge White may refer to:

Albert Smith White (1803–1864), judge of the United States District Court for the District of Indiana
George Washington White (1931–2011), judge of the United States District Court for the Northern District of Ohio
Helene White (born 1954), judge of the United States Court of Appeals for the Sixth Circuit
Jeffrey White (born 1945), judge of the United States District Court for the Northern District of California
Mastin G. White (1901–1987), judge of the United States Court of Federal Claims
Ronald A. White (born 1961), judge of the United States District Court for the Eastern District of Oklahoma
Ronnie L. White (born 1953), judge of the United States District Court for the Eastern District of Missouri
William White (judge) (1822–1883), appointed judge of the United States District Court for the Southern District of Ohio, but died before taking office

See also
Ronald Whyte
Justice White (disambiguation)